This is a list of diplomatic missions in Fiji.  The capital, Suva, hosts 23 embassies/high commissions and 4 other missions/representative offices.

Diplomatic missions in Suva

Embassies/High Commissions

Other missions/representative offices
 (Resident Office within the EU Delegation)
 (Trade Office)
 (Delegation)
 (Permanent Mission)

Embassies to open

Non-Resident Embassies/High Commissions

Resident in Canberra, Australia:

 
 
  
  
  
 
  
  
 
  
  
 
  
  
 
  
  
  
 
  
  
  
 
 
 
 
  

Resident in Wellington, New Zealand:

  
   
  
  
  
  
  
  
 
  
 
  
  
  
  

Resident in other cities:

  (Beijing)
  (Jakarta)
  (London)
  (Tokyo)
  (Kuala Lumpur)
  (Tokyo)
  (Singapore)
  (Stockholm)
  (Nuku’alofa)

Missions to the United Nations in New York City Accredited to Fiji

See also
 Foreign relations of Fiji
 Visa requirements for Fijian citizens

References

External links
Resident missions in Fiji

Foreign relations of Fiji
Diplomatic missions
Fiji